The Thripidae are the most speciose family of thrips, with over 290 genera representing just over two thousand species. They can be distinguished from other thrips by a saw-like ovipositor curving downwards, narrow wings with two veins, and antennae of six to ten antennomeres with stiletto-like forked sense cones on antennal segments III and IV.

They are considered to be among the more derived of thrips, having evolved many traits key to specializing as cryptophilous phytovores, living in the narrow spaces at the bases of leaves and within flowers.

Several species are economically significant pests, some of them invasive. Almost all of them are typical thrips which belong in the largest subfamily, the Thripinae.

Systematics
Many of the divisions within the Thripidae are not based on common ancestry, but are instead based on common environment and morphological homoplasy, and these distinctions tend to be irrelevant to true phylogenetic relationships. As a result, many species of the Thripidae have undergone recent drastic taxonomic revision, splitting and promoting two tribes, Dendrothripini and Sericothripini, to subfamily status, with the possibility of greater reorganizations to come as modern phylogenetic methods and a more comprehensive morphological analysis provide additional evidence defining evolutionary relationships. This revision is probably necessary, as more than half of the genera in family Thripidae are monobasic, with the majority of monotypic species concentrated in subfamily Thripinae. However, a 2012 molecular phylogeny found that the Thripinae was paraphyletic; further work will be needed to clarify the relationships within the group.

Subfamilies
The Thripidae are thus ordered into four subfamilies:
 Dendrothripinae Priesner, 1925 (16 genera)
 Panchaetothripinae Bagnall, 1912 (38 genera)
 Sericothripinae Karny, 1921 (11 genera)
 Thripinae (227 genera)

References

Further reading
 Hoddle, M.S. & Mound, L.A. (2003). The genus Scirtothrips in Australia (Insecta, Thysanoptera, Thripidae). Zootaxa 268:1-40. PDF

External links
 
 
 Thrips of the World Checklist: Family Thripidae
 Pictures of Taeniothrips inconsequens from Canada
 Chilli Thrips (castor thrips, Assam thrips, yellow tea thrips, strawberry thrips), Scirtothrips dorsalis Hood, Provisional Management Guidelines

Thrips on the UF / IFAS Featured Creatures Web site
 Frankliniella schultzei, common blossom thrips
 Heliothrips haemorrhoidalis, greenhouse thrips
 Scirtothrips dorsalis, chilli thrips
 Selenothrips rubrocinctus, redbanded thrips
 Thrips palmi, melon thrips
 Thrips simplex, gladiolus thrips

 
Insect families
Insect vectors of plant pathogens
Taxa named by James Francis Stephens